Violet Hari Alva (24 April 1908 – 20 November 1969) was an Indian lawyer, journalist and politician, and Deputy Chairperson of the Rajya Sabha, and member of the Indian National Congress (INC). She was the first woman lawyer to appear before a High Court in India and the first to preside over the Rajya Sabha.

Early life
Alva was born Violet Hari on 24 April 1908 in Ahmedabad. She was the eighth of nine children. Violet's father, Reverend Laxman Hari, was one of the first Indian pastors of the Church of England. Having lost both her parents when she was sixteen, her older siblings provided for her education until her matriculation at Bombay's Clare Road Convent. She graduated from St. Xavier's College, Bombay and Government Law College. For a while thereafter, she was a professor of English at the Indian Women's University, Bombay.

Career
In 1944, she was the first woman advocate in India, to have argued a case before a full High Court bench. In 1944, Alva also started a women’s magazine, The Begum, later renamed as Indian Women. From 1946 to 1947, she served as the deputy chairman of Bombay Municipal Corporation. In 1947, Alva served as an Honorary Magistrate in Mumbai; and from 1948 to 1954, she served as the President of the Juvenile Court. She was actively involved with numerous social organisations such as Young Women’s Christian Association, the Business and Professional Women’s Association and the International Federation of Women Lawyers. She was also the first woman to be elected to the Standing Committee of the All India Newspaper Editors Conference in 1952.

In 1952, Alva was elected to the Rajya Sabha, the Upper House of the Indian Parliament, where she made significant contributions to family planning, rights of animals subjected to research and defence strategy, especially the naval sector. She cautioned the government to be careful when dealing with foreign capital and supported linguistic states. After the second Indian General Election in 1957, she became Deputy Minister of State for Home Affairs.

In 1962, Alva became the Deputy Chairman of the Rajya Sabha, thereby becoming the first female to preside over the Rajya Sabha in its history. She served two consecutive terms in Rajya Sabha. Her first term commenced on 19 April 1962 and continued until 2 April 1966. Her second term began with her election to the office of Deputy Chairman on 7 April 1966 and she held the position until 16 November 1969.

In 1969, Alva resigned after Indira Gandhi declined to back her as Vice-President of India.

Personal life
In 1937, Violet Hari married politician, lawyer, journalist and later freedom fighter and parliamentarian Joachim Alva. The couple set up legal practice together. The Alvas had two sons, Niranjan and Chittaranjan, and a daughter, Maya. Niranjan Alva married Margaret Alva, parliamentarian and former Governor of Rajasthan and Gujarat. In 1943, Violet Alva was arrested by British Indian authorities. She carried her five-month old baby son, Chittaranjan, into Arthur Road Jail where she was imprisoned.

Death and legacy 
Five days after she resigned as the deputy chairperson of the Rajya Sabha, at 7:45 a.m. (IST) on 20 November 1969, she died from cerebral hemorrhage at her residence in New Delhi. Following Alva's death, both Houses of the Parliament were adjourned for a short interval that day as a mark of respect to her. Prime Minister Indira Gandhi described her as a "affable and dedicated worker to the national cause who had blazed a trail for women to follow." She added that in Alva's tenure as the Deputy Chairperson of the Rajya Sabha, she was gentle but firm when conducting the proceedings. Chairman of the Rajya Sabha Gopal Swarup Pathak, recalling Alva's participation in the Quit India Movement, felt that she left a "tradition of dignity and impartiality." Atal Bihari Vajpayee, then, a leader of the Bharatiya Jana Sangh, recollected that she had carried her five-month old baby into the jail during the Movement and felt that she was had not been treated fairly by the INC. Leaders across the political spectrum such as Era Sezhiyan, A. K. Gopalan and Nirmal Chandra Chatterjee also paid their tributes to Alva and commended her for having lived a life of simplicity.

In 2007, a portrait of Joachim and Violet Alva, the first Parliamentarian couple in history, was unveiled in Parliament. In 2008, the year of Violet's birth centenary, a stamp commemorating the couple was issued by the government of India.

See also 
 First women lawyers around the world

References 

1908 births
1969 deaths
Politicians from Ahmedabad
Rajya Sabha members from Gujarat
Indian Roman Catholics
Indian National Congress politicians from Gujarat
Members of the Cabinet of India
Deputy Chairman of the Rajya Sabha
Rajya Sabha members from Maharashtra
Women in Gujarat politics
Women in Maharashtra politics
20th-century Indian women politicians
20th-century Indian politicians
Women Indian independence activists
Politicians from Mumbai
Women union ministers of India
Women educators from Gujarat
Educators from Gujarat
20th-century Indian judges
20th-century Indian women judges
Women members of the Rajya Sabha